The knockout phase of the 2010–11 UEFA Europa League began on 15 February and concluded on 18 May 2011 with the final at Aviva Stadium in Dublin, Republic of Ireland. The knockout phase involved 32 teams: the 24 teams that finished in the top two in each group in the group stage and the eight teams that finished in third place in the UEFA Champions League group stage.

Each tie in the knockout phase, apart from the final, is played over two legs, with each team playing one leg at home. The team that has the higher aggregate score over the two legs progresses to the next round. In the event that aggregate scores finish level, the away goals rule is applied, i.e. the team that scored more goals away from home over the two legs progresses. If away goals are also equal, then 30 minutes of extra time are played, divided into two halves of 15 minutes each. The away goals rule is again applied after extra time, i.e. if there are goals scored during extra time and the aggregate score is still level, the visiting team qualifies by virtue of more away goals scored. If no goals are scored during extra time, the tie is decided by penalty shootout. In the final, the tie is played as a single match. If scores are level at the end of normal time in the final, extra time is played, followed by penalties if scores remain tied.

In the draw for the round of 32, the twelve group winners and the four better third-placed teams from the Champions League group stage (based on their match record in the group stage) are seeded, and the twelve group runners-up and the other four third-placed teams from the Champions League group stage are unseeded. A seeded team is drawn against an unseeded team, with the seeded team hosting the second leg. Teams from the same group or the same association cannot be drawn against each other. In the draws for the round of 16 onwards, there are no seedings, and teams from the same group or the same association may be drawn with each other.

Times up to end of March are CET (UTC+1), thereafter times are CEST (UTC+2).

Round and draw dates
All draws held at UEFA headquarters in Nyon, Switzerland.

Matches may also be played on Tuesdays or Wednesdays instead of the regular Thursdays due to scheduling conflicts.

Qualified teams

Teams advancing from group stage

Teams relegated from Champions League group stage

Bracket

Round of 32
The first legs were played on 15 and 17 February 2011, and the second legs were played on 22, 23 and 24 February 2011.

|}

First leg

Notes
Note 1: Played in Moscow at Luzhniki Stadium as there was severe cold in Kazan and Rubin Kazan's Central Stadium had a probable frozen pitch. Kickoff also moved to 13:00 CET (15:00 local time) due to cold weather.
Note 2: Kickoff moved to 17:00 CET (18:00 local time) due to cold weather.
Note 3: UEFA has limited capacity at Stadion Miejski in UEFA Europa League matches for security reasons.
Note 4: BATE played their knockout phase matches in Minsk at Dinamo Stadium as BATE's Haradski Stadium did not meet UEFA criteria.

Second leg

CSKA Moscow won 2–1 on aggregate.

2–2 on aggregate; Porto won on away goals.

Zenit St. Petersburg won 4–3 on aggregate.

3–3 on aggregate; Rangers won on away goals.

Liverpool won 1–0 on aggregate.

Spartak Moscow won 4–3 on aggregate.

PSV Eindhoven won 5–3 on aggregate.

Bayer Leverkusen won 6–0 on aggregate.

Villarreal won 2–1 on aggregate.

Ajax won 5–0 on aggregate.

Braga won 2–1 on aggregate.

Dynamo Kyiv won 8–1 on aggregate.

Manchester City won 3–0 on aggregate.

Twente won 4–2 on aggregate.

Benfica won 4–1 on aggregate.

2–2 on aggregate; Paris Saint-Germain won on away goals.

Round of 16
The first legs were played on 10 March 2011, and the second legs were played on 17 March 2011.

|}

First leg

Second leg

Benfica won 3–2 on aggregate.

Dynamo Kyiv won 2–1 on aggregate.

Twente won 3–2 on aggregate.

Spartak Moscow won 4–0 on aggregate.

Porto won 3–1 on aggregate.

PSV Eindhoven won 1–0 on aggregate.

Villarreal won 5–3 on aggregate.

Braga won 1–0 on aggregate.

Quarter-finals
The first legs were played on 7 April 2011, and the second legs were played on 14 April 2011.

|}

Note 5: Order of legs reversed after original draw due to proximity between the cities of Porto and Braga.

First leg

Second leg

Porto won 10–3 on aggregate.

Benfica won 6–3 on aggregate.

Villarreal won 8–2 on aggregate.

1–1 on aggregate; Braga won on away goals.

Semi-finals
The first legs were played on 28 April, and the second legs were played on 5 May 2011.

|}

Note 6: Order of legs reversed after original draw due to proximity between the cities of Porto and Braga.

First leg

Second leg

2–2 on aggregate; Braga won on away goals.

Porto won 7–4 on aggregate.

Final
The 2011 UEFA Europa League Final was played on 18 May 2011 at Aviva Stadium in Dublin, Ireland. Due to UEFA rules against corporate sponsorship outside the federation, for the final the stadium was referred to as the "Dublin Arena".

References

External links
2010–11 UEFA Europa League, UEFA.com

Knockout phase
UEFA Europa League knockout phases